Antonio Lloyd "Tony" Newton (born 1948) is an electric bass player from Detroit, Michigan. Newton has recorded among others with Tony Williams, John Lee Hooker, Smokey Robinson, Stevie Wonder, Michael Jackson, Joachim Kühn, Gary Moore and Allan Holdsworth.

Newton began his career first on piano at age seven, beginning professionally at the age of thirteen, playing bass guitar with blues legends John Lee Hooker, T-Bone Walker and Little Walter.

Newton was discovered by Motown executive Hank Cosby while playing in Detroit blues clubs at the age of 18. He was the bass player in the Motortown Revue that toured the UK in 1965, in which he performed with artists such as The Supremes and Smokey Robinson.

Discography

As leader/co-leader 
 Mysticism and Romance (1978)
 Let's Be Generous (1991) with Joachim Kühn, Miroslav Tadić and Mark Nauseef
 Oracle (Solo piano, 1992)
 Circle of Love (1998)
 ThunderFunkFusion (2012)

With Smokey Robinson
 Smokey Robinson & the Miracles LIVE! (1969)

With The Mamas & the Papas
 People Like Us (1971)

With 8th Day
I Gotta Get Home (Can't Let My Baby Get Lonely) (1973)

With Aretha Franklin
 You (1975)

With The Tony Williams New Lifetime
 Believe It (1975)
 Million Dollar Legs (1976)

With Joachim Kühn
 Joachim Kühn Band featuring Jan Akkerman & Ray Gomez – Sunshower (1978)
 J. Kühn Band – Don't Stop Me Now (1979)
 Joachim Kühn / Mark Nauseef / Tony Newton / Miroslav Tadic – Let's Be Generous (1991)

With G-Force
 G-Force (1980)

References

External links 
 Tony Newton discography, album releases & credits at Discogs
 Tony Newton Interview NAMM Oral History Library (2021)

Living people
American bass guitarists
Musicians from Detroit
1948 births
The Tony Williams Lifetime members